Jacobinte Swargarajyam is a 2016 Indian Malayalam-language family-drama film written and directed by Vineeth Sreenivasan. The film revolves around Jacob Zacharia (Renji Panicker) and the struggles faced by his son (Nivin Pauly) to clear his father's debts as his business associate cheats him. The film released on 8 April 2016 in India and later in foreign countries.

Plot

Jacob is a successful businessman settled in Dubai, United Arab Emirates with wife Sherly and their four kids – Jerry, Ebin, Ammu, Chris (Gregory, Basil, Merlin, and Chris). Jacob is always respected for his ideas by his colleagues and he had done many businesses before starting a steel business. Then the global recession began and Jacob moves for a lucrative trade through his Pakistani colleague, Ajmal, by taking a total of 8 million dirhams from his investors. Ajmal cheats Jacob, and Jacob is left in a debt of 8 million dirhams, which he gets to know on his 25th wedding anniversary. Soon Jacob's credibility and trustful way of doing business is lost and he is forced to travel to Liberia to get a deal, but that doesn't go well and he is forced to stay there to avoid arrest. With no other way and continued complaints from the investors, especially from Murali Menon, Jerry decides to give his best to solve the problems by stepping into his dad's shoes.

Jerry, without a trade license or an office, faces many difficulties at first. He decides to go out completely with what his father has taught him about business. He meets a self-made businessman, Yusuf Shah, and strikes a deal with him- eventually earning his trust- and the business grows. Jerry motivates Ebin to start a tours and travel company, and they succeed in it. Jerry settles most of the debts and gains trust with the investors. But Murali Menon pressurizes him for full payment. Jerry with his mother tries to close deals and collect money, but they were only able to collect half of what they owed. Finally Murali moves the case against Jerry in the Dubai Court but the case is rejected because the case was against the company and it is registered under Jacob's name. Murali, who also is affected by recession is in deep debt, is forced to agree with Jerry's conditions.

Jerry expands his company with Yusuf Shah and clears his family's debts. His father is back in Kerala and he goes to visit him after a long time with his girlfriend. Jerry finds hard to communicate with his father, because he isn't anymore the person he knew, a man with full of life and dreams. His mother intervenes and they break the silly tension between them and the family happily goes on with life.

Cast

Production
The film was officially announced on 29 October 2015, which would be the third film collaboration of Nivin Pauly and Vineeth Sreenivasan after the successful films Thattathin Marayathu (2012) and Oru Vadakkan Selfie (2015). Gautham Vasudev Menon was confirmed in a role in the film, which was to be his acting debut. Later, Menon was replaced by Ashwin K. Kumar. Vineeth explained "...Gautham Menon Sir was supposed to do an important role in our film. We got his dates and the shoot was planned for the first week of December in Dubai.. But then, Chennai Floods happened, airport was shut down and we couldn't bring him in. Rescheduling became impossible after that, due to several reasons,". Vineeth initially planned to essay the lead role of Jerry Jacob by himself beside directing the film. He happened to narrate the plot to Nivin in a casual conversation during the time when they were working in Oru Vadakkan Selfie (2015). After which, Nivin showed interest in Jerry but Vineeth was skeptical about casting him, but eventually did. Actor Aju Varghese joined as assistant director in the film.

Vineeth wrote the screenplay based on a real life incident of a NRI Malayali businessman Jacob Zachariah and his family after a business partner cheated them. Nivin Pauly's character is inspired by Gregory Jacob, Zachariah's son and friend to Vineeth. Beside Nivin, the film has Renji Panicker, Aima Rosmy Sebastian, Lakshmi Ramakrishnan, Sreenath Bhasi and Stacen portraying the family. Filming took place in Dubai, Ernakulam, and Ooty.

Music

The film's score was composed by Shaan Rahman with the lyrics written by Manu Manjith, B. K. Harinarayanan, Rzee and Ashwin Gopakumar. A single, "Dubai", was released by the music label Muzik247 on 6 February 2016 via iTunes, Saavn, Gaana, and Eros Now. Within hours of its release, the song became the top track on iTunes "Top 200 Regional Indian" chart, a first in Malayalam music history. Vineeth Sreenivasan, Suchith Suresan and Liya Verghese provided the vocals to "Dubai", which begins with the lyrics "Pulari Veyilinaai" describing the beauty of Dubai city. The soundtrack album was released by Muzik247 on 20 February 2016.

The first video song, "Ee Shishirakaalam", featuring the Jacob family – Nivin Pauly, Renji Panicker, Sreenath Bhasi, Lakshmi Ramakrishnan, Aima Rosmy Sebastian, and Stacen was released on 23 March 2016 on the YouTube channel of Muzik247. The song, penned by Harinarayanan B. K. was sung by Vineeth Sreenivasan and Kavya Ajit. The second video song, "Thiruvaavaniraavu", which released on 24 March 2016, featuring the Jacob family was set in the backdrop of Onam celebration of Dubai Malayalees. Unni Menon and Sithara have sung the song with additional vocals by Meera Scharma. The English track "Home" was written and sung by Ashwin Gopakumar.

Nelson K. Paul of Malayala Manorama listed "Thiruvaavaniraavu" in the top five songs in their Tunes Weekly on 1 April 2016. He wrote "'Thiruvaavaniraavu' is a heart-warming melody on Onam, the lyrics of which will make Keralites nostalgic. Unni Menon is the male singer and it feels so good to listen to him after a long time. Sithara is a fine companion to him as the female voice. The pleasant song hits its highs with the "poove poli poove" chorus and the humming by the talented singers. "Thiruvaavaniraavu" is another splendid melody from Shaan Rahman".

Release
Jacobinte Swargarajyam released in India on 8 April 2016, with 92 screens in Kerala. The film released in 77 screens in rest of India with English subtitles. After few days of release, a special screening was held in Chennai for a selected audience from the Tamil film industry. The film released on 22 April in Asia-Pacific countries Australia, New Zealand, Singapore, Thailand, Japan, Hong Kong, and Brunei. The UAE release held on 4 May and followed by Qatar on 5 May.

Reception

Critical response
The film received positive reviews from critics. Goutham V. S. of The Indian Express rated 3.5 stars out of 5 and stated that the director has showed discipline while handling dramatic situations and "has used his observations to good effect as the strong relationship bonds inside Jacob's family members and their informal homely behaviour was captured with shots that impart warmth and positive vibes, like the feel of an early morning coffee". He gave a special mention for the performance of Ahwin Kumar and praised the editing. Padmakumar K. of Malayala Manorama wrote "Being a story based on true incidents it could have been told in a more poignant manner. But Vineeth chose to play it safe by arranging the lighter and the turbid moments at regular intervals to make it an arresting narrative rather than delving deep into the heart of the issue" and rated 3 stars out of 5. He praised the performances of Renji Panicker, Lakshmy Ramakrishnan and Ashwin Kumar.

Gautaman Bhaskaran of Hindustan Times awarded 3 out of 5 and stated "The movie stays pretty much focussed – and does not stray into any romantic alleyways (though Jerry has a girlfriend) – except to include a few squabbles which one of Jerry's brothers gets into. These add a certain balance to the film's structure, and with performances by most of the cast members – particularly Pauly, Panicker and Ramakrishnan – disarmingly understated, Sreenivasan's work is captivating (sic)". He appreciated the editing. Akhila Menon of Filmibeat rated 3.5 out of 5 and praised the performances of Renji Panicker, Nivin Pauly, and Lakshmy Ramakrishnan. She wrote "The director has perfectly narrated the well-written script, with the right mix of light humour and emotional elements" praising Vineeth Sreenivasan. She also lauded the cinematography, editing and the songs, especially "Thiruvaavaniraavu".

Anu James of International Business Times awarded 4 out of 5 and mentioned "Although the movie is predictable, the beautiful moments we come across make us feel relaxed, eager to know how the movie progresses. The first half is totally a Renji Panicker show, while the second half belongs to Nivin as the hero". She praised the performances of Renji Panicker and Lakshmy Ramakrishnan, cinematography, editing, and songs. Sanjith Sidhardhan of The Times of India stated "Vineeth has taken extra effort to tell this real-life story as honestly as possible, the added attention may have dropped the entertainment quotient a tad. The film, however, makes up with several feel-good moments that accentuate the value of relationships". He praised the casting and performances of Lakshmi Ramakrishnan, Renji Panicker, Ashwin Kumar, and Nivin Pauly, and also cinematography and music. He rated 4 out of 5 stars.

Mani Prabhu of NDTV is written "the first hour of the film, which brilliantly establishes the Jacobs' kind of family, despite baiting us with continuous Vishu movie cliches, superbly spins each of them in tasteful angles", "the second half of the film, which gives all the opportunities for unabashed melodrama and parental sentiments, is surprisingly restrained, refreshing and free of bloat. The romantic track is brushed away confidently with a two-minute exposition. Characters don't go out of their way for the sake of entertainment". He also praised the performances of Nivin Pauly, Renji Panicker, Lakshmy Ramakrishnan, and Sreenath Bhasi. Sify described it "Emotional roller coaster" and wrote "...the story has been narrated in a highly conventional manner to the extent that things get a bit predictable at times. But considering this has been a real life story that a family actually went through, it can be justified generally". And appreciated the direction, cinematography, music and performances of Nivin Pauly, Renji Panicker, Lakshmy Ramakrishnan, and Sreenath Bhasi.

Box office                                            
It grossed  in the opening day from Kerala box office. The collection was increased to 1.40 crore in the second day. It grossed 9.11 crore in 9 days of release in Kerala indicating a steady collection. Within two weeks, the film grossed 11.54 crore from Kerala. From Kochi multiplexes, it earned 1.53 crore in two weeks. The gross was over 15 crore within three weeks from Kerala. The film collected  in the 35 days from the Kerala box office alone and earned  from Ernakulam multiplexes alone, a record and also earned  from U.S. box office during its final run(fourth weekend). The film earned  from the United Kingdom-Ireland box office within the final run(third weekend). It grossed  at the box office and completed 100 days in Kerala.

Awards
Asianet Film Awards

Renji Panicker (Best Supporting 
Actor)
Unni Menon & Sithara for Most Popular Duet

Asiavision Film Awards 2016

Renji Panicker (Best actor in a supporting role)
Nivin Pauly (Best Actor)
Vineeth Sreenivasan (Best Film)

Critics award 2017

Second best film
Vineeth Sreenivasan (Best Screenplay award)
Nivin Pauly (Special Jury award)
Renji Panicker (Best Character Actor)

References

External links
 

2016 films
Films scored by Shaan Rahman
Indian business films
2010s Malayalam-language films
Indian drama films
Indian family films
Films shot in Dubai
Films directed by Vineeth Sreenivasan
2016 drama films